Aminabada is a village in Rajavommangi Mandal, Alluri Sitharama Raju district in the state of Andhra Pradesh in India.

Geography 

అమినాబాద 
 India census, Aminabada had a population of 1987, out of which 781 were male and 1206 were female. The population of children below 6 years of age was 9%. The literacy rate of the village was 62%.

References 

Villages in Rajavommangi mandal